The 1971 Trans-American Championship was the sixth running of the Sports Car Club of America's Trans-Am Series. The format was altered to an over 2500cc class and an under 2500cc class, up 500cc from past years. All races used split classes except where noted. The year marked the rise of Datsun as a competitive brand, with the Japanese company winning several races throughout the season. American Motors, led by Mark Donohue's 7 wins, and Datsun, led by John Morton's 6 wins, won the manufacturers' championships.

Schedule

 Horst Kwech won the race on track, but was disqualified for an oversize fuel tank.

Championships
Points were awarded according to finishing position. Only the highest-placed car scored points for the manufacturer. Only the best 8 finishes counted toward the championship. Drivers' championships were not awarded in Trans-Am until 1972.

Over 2.5L manufacturers

Under 2.5L manufacturers

 Tie broken based on Datsun's higher number of wins.

See also
1971 Can-Am season

References

Trans-Am Series
Transam
Transam